Mount Eissinger is a large ridge-like mountain at the north side of Riley Glacier on the west side of Palmer Land. It was mapped by the United States Geological Survey (USGS) in 1974, and was named by the Advisory Committee on Antarctic Names for Karlheinz Eissinger, a USGS topographic engineer with the Ellsworth Land Survey party, 1968–69.

References 

Mountains of Palmer Land